Neisseria sicca is a commensal organism belonging to the genus Neisseria. It is Gram-negative and oxidase-positive. There are multiple strains of this species, some of which are reported to have caused septicaemia in immunocompromised patients. These bacteria are the first among Neisseria species to have been shown to have O-repeat structure in their liposaccharide.

References

External links
Type strain of Neisseria sicca at BacDive -  the Bacterial Diversity Metadatabase

Gram-negative bacteria
Neisseriales
Bacteria described in 1908